Kersey Priory was a priory in Kersey, Suffolk, England. 
It was founded before 1218 as a hospital dedicated St Mary the Blessed Virgin and St Anthony under rule of Austin Canons. It was dissolved in 1443 and the next year transferred to King's College, Cambridge.

Seal
The twelfth-century seal of Kersey Priory is a pointed oval bearing a bust of the Blessed Virgin crowned in clouds, below is the head of St. Anthony between them is a sun and crescent moon. It has the legend round the edge of ‘Sigill' sce Marie et sci Antonii de Kerseia’

Priors of Kersey
Richard Waleys, died 1331 
Robert de Akenham, elected 1331
John Calle, resigned 1387
John de Polstede, elected 1387
John Buche, elected 1394
John Dewche, elected 1411 
Nicholas Bungaye, resigned 1422
Richard Fyn, elected 1422
John Duch, elected 1431 
William Woodbridge, elected 1432

Dissolution
When King's College took over the Manor property, the village church tower was completed and the building enlarged to compensate for the loss of the Priory church.  Today the Priory chapel is a ruin situated on private property next to a medieval farmhouse.  The walls of the chapel were 49 ft long and there were two 11 ft wide bays with arches. The arch from transept to choir was 10 feet wide and the transept 21 feet long.

References

External links 
 

Monasteries in Suffolk
Kersey, Suffolk